Greenwood Township is a civil township of Oceana County in the U.S. state of Michigan.  As of the 2000 census, the township population was 1,154.

Geography

History
Greenwood Township was established in 1858.

Communities
Forest City is an unincorporated community first settled in 1855.  It had a post office from 1859 until 1975.

Demographics
As of the census of 2000, there were 1,154 people, 392 households, and 310 families residing in the township. There were 461 housing units at an average density of 12.9 per square mile (5.0/km2). The racial makeup of the township was 96.01% White, 0.09% African American, 0.69% Native American, 0.26% Asian, 1.82% from other races, and 1.13% from two or more races. Hispanic or Latino of any race were 2.60% of the population.

There were 392 households, out of which 41.3% had children under the age of 18 living with them, 63.3% were married couples living together, 10.7% had a female householder with no husband present, and 20.9% were non-families. 16.1% of all households were made up of individuals, and 6.9% had someone living alone who was 65 years of age or older.  The average household size was 2.94 and the average family size was 3.29.

In the township the population was spread out, with 31.2% under the age of 18, 10.3% from 18 to 24, 28.5% from 25 to 44, 22.0% from 45 to 64, and 8.0% who were 65 years of age or older.  The median age was 32 years. For every 100 females, there were 101.0 males.  For every 100 females age 18 and over, there were 99.5 males.

The median income for a household in the township was $36,964, and the median income for a family was $40,729. Males had a median income of $31,793 versus $21,818 for females. The per capita income for the township was $13,910.  About 15.2% of families and 16.7% of the population were below the poverty line, including 22.8% of those under age 18 and 8.0% of those age 65 or over.

References

Notes

Sources

Townships in Oceana County, Michigan
1858 establishments in Michigan
Populated places established in 1858
Townships in Michigan